Sotouboua is a town located in Sotouboua Prefecture in the Centrale Region of Togo.

Transport
Sotouboua is the apparent railway terminus in the north.

Accident
On 6 December 1965, two trucks crashed into a crowd of dancers, killing 125 people. This was one of the worst road accidents in the country on record.

See also
 List of road accidents
 Railway stations in Togo

References

Populated places in Centrale Region, Togo